Tierra madre ("Mother Earth") is a 2010 film made in Tecate and  Tijuana, Mexico.  It was directed by Dylan Verrechia, and co-written by Aidee Gonzalez based on her real life, with original music by Nortec Collective and Paco Mendoza.

The movie has been screened at over 25 film festivals and won the Jury Award for Best Feature Film at the Reeling Chicago Lesbian and Gay International Film Festival, the Jury Award for Honorary Feature Film at the Festival Internacional de Cine de Morelia, the Diversity Award for Best Feature Film at the Barcelona Gay and Lesbian International Film, the Outstanding Achievement in Foreign Feature Award at the Williamsburg International Film Festival, the Cinesul Award for Best Feature Film at the Cinesul Ibero-Americano Film Festival, the Golden Palm at the Mexico International Film Festival, the Honorary Mention Prize at the New Jersey Film Festival, and the Silver Lei for Excellence in Filmmaking at the Honolulu International Film Festival.

Synopsis 
Tierra madre is based on Aidee Gonzalez's true life, a woman living on the Mexican border towns of Tecate and Tijuana, determined to raise her children with her female partner. This narrative feature makes the strong case of the strength, the independence and the solidarity that exits among women of all ages.

References

External links 
 
 
 Corre Camara
 Los Angeles Times
  CNN Mexico
  Don't Label It!
  Poder Edomex
 Morelia International Film Festival

2010 films
2010s Spanish-language films
2010 drama films
Lesbian-related films
LGBT-related drama films
Mexican drama films
2010 LGBT-related films
2010s Mexican films